PHHS may refer to:

 Park Hill High School, in Kansas City, Missouri, United States
 Parsippany Hills High School, in Parsippany-Troy Hills, New Jersey, United States
 Pascack Hills High School, in Bergen County, New Jersey, United States 
 Pennant Hills High School, in Pennant Hills, Sydney, New South Wales, Australia
 Perry Hall High School, in Baltimore, Maryland, United States
 Piedmont Hills High School, in San Jose, California, United States
 , a private school in Klang, Selangor, Malaysia
 Port Huron High School, Port Huron, Michigan, United States
 Pei Hwa High School, Ledang, Johor, Malaysia
 Parkland Memorial Hospital
 Prince Henry's High School, Evesham, Worcestershire, United Kingdom.

See also
 Patrick Henry High School (disambiguation)
 Pleasant Hill High School (disambiguation)